The Fokker M.5 was an unarmed single-seat monoplane aircraft designed and built by Anthony Fokker in 1913. It served as a light reconnaissance aircraft with the German army at the outbreak of World War I and was the basis for the first successful fighter aircraft in German service, the Fokker E.I.

Design
Fokker's design for the M.5 was very closely based on that of the French Morane-Saulnier H shoulder-wing monoplane although the fuselage had a welded steel tube frame in place of the wooden structure of the Type H.

The power-plant was a  Oberursel U.0 7-cylinder rotary engine (Gnome Lambda licence-built by Motorenfabrik Oberursel). As in the Morane original, the tail and elevators were all-moving, having no fixed sections. There were two versions of the M.5: the long-span 'M.5L' and the short-span 'M.5K' ("K" for kurz meaning "short" in German). The M.5 was light, strong and manoeuvrable, capable of aerobatics (although, like all aircraft relying on the early style of Morane balanced elevators, it had very sensitive pitch control). Fokker himself performed in the M.5 at Johannisthal in May and June 1914, winning a number of awards.

German army adoption
The German army adopted the militarised long-span M.5L, manufactured by Halberstadt, designated the 'A.II'. A two-seat version, known as the 'M.8' also entered service as the 'A.I' which was built by Fokker. These aircraft were used on the Western and Eastern Fronts in the early stages of the war. In early 1915, 10 M.5Ks were ordered, designated the 'A.III', but before delivery five were modified, being equipped with a single 7.92 mm (.312 in) Parabellum MG14 machine gun, becoming the five Fokker 'M.5K/MG' production prototypes of the Fokker E.I.

Variants
M.5K (K- Kurz – short) Short span version, retrospectively designated Fokker A.III after entering service with the Imperial German Army as scouting aircraft.
M.5L (L – Lange – long) Long span version, retrospectively designated Fokker A.I after entering service with the Imperial German Army as scouting aircraft.
M.5K/MG Five M.5K aircraft armed with a single  Parabellum MG14 machine gun as the production prototypes of the Fokker E.I
M.6 A tandem two-seat version of the M.5. The sole aircraft was destroyed during testing in a forced landing after pilot-induced engine failure.
M.7Based closely on the M.5, the M.7 had sesquiplane wings. Twenty M.7s were produced for the Imperial German Navy.
M.8 Production side-by-side two-seater scout entering service as the Fokker A.II.
Fokker A.I Service designation of the M.5L
Fokker A.II Service designation of the M.8
Fokker A.III Service designation of the M.5K
Fokker E.IThe armed production aircraft in service with the Imperial German Army, popularly known as the Fokker Eindekker, responsible for the Fokker Scourge.
W.3 / W.4 An M.7 fitted with floats.

Operators
 
Austro-Hungarian Imperial and Royal Aviation Troops
Austro-Hungarian Navy
 
Luftstreitkrafte

Specifications (M.5K)

See also

References

M.5
1910s German military reconnaissance aircraft
Military aircraft of World War I
Single-engined tractor aircraft
Aircraft first flown in 1913
Shoulder-wing aircraft
Rotary-engined aircraft